Padri Jo Goth is a Christian village in Sanghar District, Sindh, Pakistan.

History 
The village consists of around 300 families living on land bought by the Catholic Church in 1938. Franciscan Father Ken Viegas was the parish priest in 2004. The Faithful Companions of Jesus Sisters also run a dispensary out of their St. Clare Convent.
The St Isidore primary school run by the Franciscan Sisters of the Heart of Jesus provides education to the community up to the eighth grade. In 2011 some 200 disadvantaged children were receiving an education at the school funded by Catholic Missions.

Local violence 
The marriage of a young tribal Hindu woman and a Christian man she chose angered her community in 2004. This led to friction between the two communities.

In 2012, a mother of two was set on fire by her in-laws over a domestic dispute.
In 2013 a Muslim man wanted to marry a Catholic nurse from the village. He approached her with a proposal to marry him and convert to Islam. When she turned him down, he threatened to abduct her and disfigure her with acid.

Current events
The Mission Fund in Malta provided financial help to the local families who lost their homes and belongings in the 2013 flood.

On 19 June 2020, St. Isidore's parish participated in the 11th World Rosary Relay. The parish priest at the time was Fr Felix de Souza OFM.

Notables 

Bishop Sebastian Francis Shaw, appointed Archbishop of Lahore in 2013, was born in the village in 1957

References 

Populated places in Sanghar District
Catholic Church in Pakistan